Joshua Key may refer to:
 Joshua Key (soldier)
 Joshua Key (footballer)